Central District of Sirvan County is a district (bakhsh) in Sirvan County, Ilam Province, Iran. The District has one city: Lumar. The District has two rural districts (dehestan): Lumar Rural District, and Rudbar Rural District.

See also 
 Ban Shirvan
 Bi Bi Shirvan
 Karkhaneh-ye Qand-e Shirvan
 Now Shirvan Kola
 Shirvan County
 Shirvan, Iran
 Shirvan, Lorestan
 Shirvan Mahalleh
 Shirvan Shahlu

References 

Districts of Ilam Province
Sirvan County